The Concert Jazz Band is an album recorded by American jazz saxophonist Gerry Mulligan featuring performances recorded in 1960 which were released on the Verve label.

Track listing
 "Sweet and Slow" (Harry Warren, Al Dubin) - 5:17 	
 "Bweebida Bobbida" (Gerry Mulligan) - 5:47 	
 "Manoir de Mes Rêves (Django's Castle)" (Django Reinhardt) - 3:49 	
 "You Took Advantage of Me" (Richard Rodgers, Lorenz Hart) - 4:39 	
 "Out of This World" (Harold Arlen, Johnny Mercer) - 3:50 	
 "My Funny Valentine" (Rodgers, Hart) - 5:03 	
 "Broadway" (Billy Bird, Teddy McRae, Henri Wood) - 5:21 	
 "I'm Gonna Go Fishin'" (Duke Ellington, Peggy Lee) - 5:54

Personnel
Gerry Mulligan - baritone saxophone
Don Ferrara, Conte Candoli and Nick Travis (tracks 1-7), Danny Stiles and Phil Sunkel (track 8) - trumpet
Wayne Andre - trombone
Alan Raph - bass trombone
Bob Brookmeyer - valve trombone
Dick Meldonian - alto saxophone
Gene Quill - alto saxophone, clarinet
Zoot Sims, Jim Reider (track 8) - tenor saxophone
Gene Allen - baritone saxophone, bass clarinet
Buddy Clark (tracks 1-7), Bill Tackus (track 8) - bass
Mel Lewis (tracks 1-7), Dave Bailey (track 8) - drums

References

Gerry Mulligan albums
1960 albums
Verve Records albums